WMPS may refer to:

 WMPS, a radio station (1210 AM) licensed to Bartlett, Tennessee, United States
 WHRK, a radio station (97.1 FM) licensed to Memphis, Tennessee, United States, which formerly used the call sign WMPS-FM from 1959 to 1977
 WIVG, a radio station (96.1 FM) licensed to Tunica, Mississippi, United States, which formerly used the call sign WMPS from 1998 to 2001
 WLRM, a radio station (1380 AM) licensed to Millington, Tennessee, United States, which used the call sign WMPS from 1983 until 1998
 WMFS (AM), a radio station (680 AM) licensed to Memphis, Tennessee, United States, which used the call sign WMPS from 1937 until 1983
 Warrior Modular Protection System, an upgrade to the Warrior tracked armoured vehicle